The 1902 Argentine Primera División was the 11th season of top-flight football in Argentina. Alumni won its 3rd consecutive league championship. Barracas A.C. (promoted in 1901) added to the tournament.

The first division championship was expanded to a 5-team league format, with each team playing the other twice. The tournament started on May 11 and ended on September 21. There were not relegations.

Final standings

References

Argentine Primera División seasons
1902 in Argentine football
1902 in South American football
1902 in South American football leagues